Yanceyville is a town in and the county seat of Caswell County, North Carolina, United States. Located in the Piedmont Triad region of the state, the town had a population of 1,937 at the 2020 census.

The settlement was founded in 1792 and was later named Yanceyville in honor of U.S. Congressman Bartlett Yancey, Jr. when it was chartered as an incorporated town in 1833.

There are three public schools in Yanceyville as well as a satellite campus for Piedmont Community College. Maud F. Gatewood Municipal Park and Caswell Community Arboretum are popular recreational areas.

Yanceyville Municipal Airport serves general aviation aircraft.

History

The identity of Yanceyville's namesake has been a matter of historical debate. The prevailing view is that the town is named after U.S. Congressman Bartlett Yancey, Jr., (1785–1828). Surviving documents had strongly suggested that it was named for Bartlett Yancey, Jr.'s older brother James Yancey (1768–1829). The elder Yancey was a legislator, merchant, planter, public official, and educator. In 1977, North Carolina historian William S. Powell wrote that the preponderance of evidence supported Bartlett Yancey, Jr., as the town's namesake.

Yanceyville has been the county seat since 1792. It was originally called Caswell Court House until 1833. In 1833, Yanceyville was chartered as an incorporated town, although years later this was seemingly forgotten because a municipal charter was obtained from the General Assembly again in 1877. In 1885, the state legislature passed a similar act, but why it was necessary is unknown. In 1899, the act authorizing the town's incorporation was repealed. In 1905, Yanceyville was incorporated again, only to have the charter repealed once more in 1915. The town remained an unincorporated community until a successful attempt at reorganization and incorporation occurred in 1986.

Caswell County's historic courthouse is a prominent landmark and center of activity in Yanceyville. Its design combines Italian Romanesque and classical features in a manner unique to North Carolina courthouse architecture. Located in the town's historic district in Court Square, it has been restored and provides offices for county departments.

A new county courthouse was constructed in the mid-1970s and is located a few blocks north of Court Square. Construction on the preceding historic courthouse began in 1858 during the tail end of the area's prosperous "Boom Era." Built using enslaved labor, it was completed in 1861 amid the early stages of the American Civil War.

If Yanceyville had not been the county seat, it likely would have been abandoned as a ghost town after the war's end in 1865. The previous plantation way of life had disappeared. No clear geographic or commercial reason for the town's existence remained other than the purpose of functioning as the county's seat of government.

With no railroad, major waterway, or ability to attract commerce, Yanceyville was almost entirely reliant on agricultural enterprises in the surrounding county in the decades following the Civil War. These businesses focused mainly on tobacco and were dominated by markets beyond Caswell County. Agricultural practices in Yanceyville during the antebellum period and thereafter had overused the land and caused soil erosion. Gullies were evident on most farms. From 1880 to 1900, the dire economic situation led to a sharp decline in the township's population. Such agronomic challenges persisted well into the 20th century.

Improved farming techniques in the 1940s and 1950s curbed further land degradation, which contributed significantly to Yanceyville's economic development and revitalization. During the latter half of the 20th century and into the 21st, the local economy continued to develop, diversify, and experience growth away from tobacco cultivation.

Geography

Yanceyville is located at the center of Caswell County.

Climate
On the Köppen climate classification scale, Yanceyville is in the Cfa (humid subtropical) zone, which is standard for the state. Its location in the Piedmont region means average winter temperatures ranging from 28.9–52.4 °F (−1.7–11.3 °C), with moderate snowfall, and mild to hot summers.

The county is sometimes included in the well-known "Carolina Alley." This is mostly caused by the cold air from the Appalachian Mountains mixing with the warm Piedmont air. According to USA.com, the county ranks No. 79 in tornado risk out of all 100 counties in North Carolina. It also ranks No. 41 in earthquake risk in the state. From 1950 to 2010, there have been 28 tornadoes with an EF Scale of 2.0 or more; out of all 28, four have had an EF Scale of 3.0. From 1950 to 2010, there were a reported 12,795 severe weather related incidents (hail, thunderstorms/heavy winds, and flooding).

Yanceyville is in a very low-risk hurricane zone, with thirty-five occurring in the area since 1930. The largest was the 1935 Labor Day hurricane and the most recent was Tropical Storm Ana in 2015. From 1950 to 2010, there have been 13 reported tropical storms/hurricanes that have hit the area. One reason that August and September are among the wettest months is due to the influx of precipitation caused by the yearly hurricane season.

The mildest months of the year for Yanceyville and the region are May, September, and October. There are seven months (April–October) with average high temperatures in the range of 70.5–89.8 °F (21.4–32.1 °C). In 2018, July was the hottest month with an average high temperature of 89.1 °F (31.7 °C). January is usually the coldest month for the town. The most humid months are June, July, and August.

Demographics

2020 census

At the 2020 census, there were 1,937 people and an estimated 1,208 households and 690 families residing in the town. In 2020, the estimated median age in Yanceyville was 48.9 years. For every 100 females, there were an estimated 113.6 males.

2010 census

At the 2010 census, there were 2,039 people and an estimated 671 households and 359 families residing in Yanceyville. In 2010, the estimated median age was 41.1 years. For every 100 females, there were an estimated 110.2 males.

2000 census
At the 2000 census, there were 2,091 people and an estimated 658 households and 400 families residing in Yanceyville. The population density was 450.9 people per square mile (174.0/km). There were 748 housing units at an average density of 161.3 per square mile (62.2/km). The racial makeup of the town was 53.99% African American, 44.29% White, 1.00% Hispanic or Latino, 0.33% Native American, 0.14% Asian, 0.33% from other races, and 0.91% from two or more races.

Out of the 658 households, 29.3% had children under the age of 18 living with them, 33.0% were married couples living together, 24.3% had a female householder with no husband present, and 39.2% were non-families. 36.8% of all households consisted of individuals living alone and 19.0% had someone living alone who was 65 years of age or older. The average household size was 2.21 and the average family size was 2.88.

The age distribution of the town's population consisted of 19.6% under the age of 18, 8.4% from 18 to 24, 32.9% from 25 to 44, 20.8% from 45 to 64, and 18.3% who were 65 years of age or older.

The median income for a household in Yanceyville was $20,353 and the median income for a family was $26,417. Males had a median income of $24,632 versus $20,398 for females. The per capita income for the town was $16,956. About 23.3% of families and 27.7% of the population were below the poverty line, including 41.7% of those under age 18 and 24.1% of those age 65 and over.

Economy

Yanceyville's economy was historically reliant on tobacco cultivation. The local economy was negatively impacted when demand began decreasing in the late 1990s due to a crisis in the tobacco industry regarding the health effects of smoking.

Three main areas of business are located in Yanceyville: Downtown (the Historic District), West Main Street, and Highway 86. The town's central business district (CBD) starts at NC 62 and Main Street, extending west on Main Street for roughly one mile (1.6 km). Its focal point is Court Square, which contains the county's historic courthouse.

Approximately half of the central business district is located within the town's historic district. Businesses in the CBD include banks, law offices, CPAs, a newspaper company, an auction house, hair salons, barber shops, a take-out restaurant, a bike shop, and a general store. CoSquare, a county-supported coworking space, is located in the downtown historic area.

The largest industries in Yanceyville are accommodation and food services, health care and social assistance, and manufacturing. Manufacturers in the town include USA-RS Services, Chemtek, and Royal Textile Mills. Yanceyville is also home to one industrial park: Caswell County Industrial Park.

The Caswell County Local Foods Council initiates community-driven projects and manages the Caswell Farmers' Market in Yanceyville. NC Cooperative Extension's office in Yanceyville connects local farmers and agribusinesses with vital research-based information and technology.

Arts and culture

Yanceyville annually hosts the "Bright Leaf Hoedown," which takes place in the town square. It is a one-day outdoor festival held in late September featuring local food vendors, live entertainment, crafts, and non-profit organizations. The event usually draws more than 5,000 guests.

The Caswell County Historical Association holds its annual Heritage Festival each May in Yanceyville. The festival celebrates town and county history through living history reenactments, tours, games, vendors, and live music.

Yanceyville features an antebellum courthouse designed by William Percival in addition to other antebellum buildings and houses. The Yanceyville Historic District, Bartlett Yancey House, Graves House, William Henry and Sarah Holderness House, John Johnston House, Melrose/Williamson House, and Poteat House are listed on the National Register of Historic Places.

The town's cultural attractions also include:

Caswell County Civic Center
Caswell County Veterans Memorial
Caswell Council for the Arts
Caswell Farmers' Market
Caswell Horticulture Club
Fulton-Walton Fellowship Center
Gunn Memorial Public Library
Historic Caswell County Jail
Old Poteat School (Poteat One-Room School) 
Richmond-Miles History Museum
Town of Yanceyville Public Safety Memorial
Yanceyville's municipal water tower
Yanceyville Museum of Art
Yanceyville Pavilion 

The Caswell County Civic Center has a full-size professionally equipped stage, a 912-seat auditorium, meeting and banquet facilities for up to 500, a lobby art gallery, and accessories for concerts, theatre, and social functions. Events are also held at the Yanceyville Pavilion and the Fulton-Walton Fellowship Center.

Gunn Memorial Public Library offers summer reading programs to children of all ages.

Parks and recreation

Outdoor recreational areas in Yanceyville include:
Caswell Community Arboretum
Caswell County Parks and Recreation Center
Maud F. Gatewood Municipal Park
Yanceyville Park/Memorial Park

S.R. Farmer Lake, located in Caswell County, was built in 1986 for the people of nearby Yanceyville.

The Caswell County Department of Parks and Recreation offers indoor and outdoor recreational facilities as well as sports programs and activities.

Government

 
Yanceyville operates under a council-manager form of government. The Town Council is composed of four council members and a mayor who are elected at large by voters. Neither the mayor nor council members run for office according to party affiliation. Ballots do not contain their political party membership information. The nonpartisan Town Council's role is to facilitate economic, infrastructure, and community development. Moreover, it determines which services to offer citizens to ensure the community stays socially and fiscally prosperous and healthy.

The Town Council is also responsible for establishing policies guiding the town's administration e.g., public safety, law enforcement, fire and rescue, and emergency services issues. Additionally, its responsibilities include setting Yanceyville's tax, water, and sewer rates, and appointing a town manager.

The town manager's responsibilities include directing operational activities, supervising personnel, budgeting, planning, zoning, and purchasing. In July 2021, Kamara Barnett was appointed the town manager of Yanceyville.

In July 2021, the Town Council's members were:

 Alvin Foster, Mayor 
 Odessa D. Gwynn, Mayor Pro-Tem  
 Margie Badgett-Lampkin 
 Brian Massey
 Keith Tatum

The Town Council conducts meetings at the Yanceyville Municipal Services Building. Yanceyville's government has additional offices for economic development, public services, public safety, human resources, finance, utilities, planning, zoning, and general administration.  The Caswell County Board of Commissioners holds its regular meetings at the historic courthouse in Yanceyville.

Education

Higher education
Piedmont Community College has a branch campus in Yanceyville.

Primary and secondary education

The following public schools are located in Yanceyville:
 Bartlett Yancey High School
 N.L. Dillard Middle School
 Oakwood Elementary School

Media

Print media
 The Caswell Messenger

Radio
Yanceyville is the town of license for 1540 AM WYNC, Gospel music

Television
Yanceyville is part of the Greensboro–High Point–Winston-Salem designated market area, the 46th largest broadcast television market in the United States.

Infrastructure

Utilities 

Yanceyville's electric system is maintained by Duke Energy and Piedmont Electric Cooperative.

Transportation
The town is not directly served by any interstate highways, railways, or rivers.

Railroad

Major highways 

  (concurrency with US 29)

Airport 
 Yanceyville Municipal Airport: general aviation (GA) airport

Public transit 
 Caswell County Area Transportation System (CATS): public transport service for residents of Caswell County

Healthcare
Caswell Family Medical Center is the largest primary care provider in Yanceyville. Urgent and specialty care, as well as behavioral healthcare services, are also available.

Other 
 Caswell Correctional Center, a medium custody facility of the North Carolina Department of Adult Correction

Notable people
 Mic'hael Brooks (born 1991), former NFL player who attended high school in Yanceyville
 Max Drake (born 1952), musician
 Donna Edwards (born 1958), former U.S. representative
 Samuel Simeon Fels (1860–1950), businessman and philanthropist
 A. Oveta Fuller (born 1955), associate professor of microbiology at University of Michigan Medical School
 Maud Gatewood (1934–2004), artist
 Calvin Graves (1804–1877), house member of the North Carolina General Assembly and member of the North Carolina Senate
 Henry Lee Graves (1813–1881), president of Baylor University
 John Gunn (1939–2010), race car driver
 Jacob E. Long (1880–1955), 15th lieutenant governor of North Carolina from 1925 to 1929 serving under Governor Angus W. McLean
 Ida Isabella Poteat (1858–1940), artist and instructor
 William Louis Poteat (1856–1938), professor of biology and president of Wake Forest University, public intellectual, early advocate of Darwinian evolution
 John Kerr (1782–1842), member of the U.S. House of Representatives
 John Kerr Jr. (1811–1879), congressional representative and jurist
 John H. Kerr (1873–1958), jurist and politician
 John W. Stephens (1834–1870), North Carolina state senator, agent for the Freedmen's Bureau
 The Badgett Sisters, folk and gospel group composed of sisters Celester, Connie, and Cleonia Badgett
 Neal Watlington (1922–2019), MLB player for the Philadelphia Athletics
 Hugh Webster (1943–2022), register of deeds for Alamance County and North Carolina state senator
 Carl Willis (born 1960), former MLB player and current pitching coach for the Cleveland Guardians
 Bartlett Yancey, Jr. (1785–1828), Democrat-Republican U.S. congressman

See also
 List of municipalities in North Carolina
 National Register of Historic Places listings in Caswell County, North Carolina
 Research Triangle Park, the largest research park in the United States located 49.7 miles (80 km) southeast of Yanceyville
 Virginia International Raceway, a nearby multi-purpose road course offering auto and motorcycle racing
 Hyco Lake, a reservoir in Caswell and Person counties. It is a popular destination for recreational activities such as camping, fishing, boating, water skiing, and swimming.

References

External links

 

Towns in Caswell County, North Carolina
Towns in North Carolina
County seats in North Carolina
Populated places established in 1792
1792 establishments in North Carolina
People from Yanceyville, North Carolina
Piedmont Triad